This is a list of cricket players who have played representative cricket for Sri Lanka Cricket Combined XI in Sri Lanka. Sri Lanka Cricket Combined XI was founded in 2010.

It includes players that have played at least one match, in senior First-Class, List A cricket, or Twenty20 matches. Practice matches are not included, unless they have officially been classified at First-class tour matches.

The Inter-Provincial Cricket Tournament is the premier domestic cricket competition in Sri Lanka. It was founded in 1990.

First Class Players
Sri Lanka Cricket Combined XI is yet to play any first class cricket matches.

List 'A' Players
All of the Players who have represented Sri Lanka Cricket Combined XI in List A cricket domestic one day competitions:

Twenty20 Players
All of the Players who have represented Sri Lanka Cricket Combined XI in Twenty20 domestic competitions:

External links
Players Who Have Played For Sri Lanka Cricket Combined XI
Sri Lanka Cricket

Sri Lanka Cricket Combined XI
Sri Lanka Cricket Combined